Structure of the Japanese Army in Mengjiang.

Commanders of the Japanese Mongolian Garrison
Yoshio Kozuki:- Commanding General, Mongolia Army
Ichiro Shichida:- Commanding General, Mongolia Garrison Army
Hajime Sugiyama:- concurrently Commanding General, Mongolia Garrison
Sadamu Shimomura:- Commander of Mongolia Garrison Army
Hiroshi Nemoto:- Commander of Mongolia Garrison Army

Chief of Staff Japanese Mongolian Garrison Army
Shinichi Tanaka:- Chief of Staff, Mongolia Garrison Army

Japanese Official Advisers in Mengjiang Government
Kanji Tsuneoka:- Japanese adviser, represented the real power in the local administration. Founder and Director of Kalgan Central Academy
Toyonori Yamauchi:- advisor on a mission to "inherit the great spirit of Genghis Khan and retake the territories that belong to Mongolia, completing the grand task of reviving the prosperity of the nationality".

Commanders and Officers in regular Armies, Japanese Mongolian Army
Hideki Tojo:- Commander, 1st Independent Mixed Brigade, Chahar Expeditionary Force
Kōji Sakai:- the direct tank commander, 1st Independent Mixed Brigade
Kitsuju Ayabe:- Colonel, engaged in Chahar area operation as Staff Officer, Kwantung Army, North China Detachment
Hiroshi Nemoto:- Commander of 18th Army (with HQ in Kalgan)

Japanese Armored Division in Mongolia

3rd Tank Division
Nicknamed "Taki" (Water Fall), it was formed in June 1942 in Mengjiang; it ended the war in China.
Tank Regiments:
8th Tank Regiment
12th Tank Regiment
13th Tank Regiment
17th Tank Regiment

Imperial Japanese Army
Mengjiang